The 10th and Cass Streets Neighborhood Historic District is located in La Crosse, Wisconsin.

Description
The district is made up of a residential neighborhood, including many of the earliest elaborate homes in the city. These include the 1859 Italianate Laverty-Martindale house, the 1871 Italian Villa-styled Webb-Withee house, the 1874 Italianate Governor George Peck house, the 1884 Stick style Frank Burton house, the 1886 Queen Anne Crosby house, and the 1914 Prairie style Kinnear house.

References

Historic districts on the National Register of Historic Places in Wisconsin
National Register of Historic Places in La Crosse County, Wisconsin